Ageas is a Belgian-French multinational insurance company co-headquartered in Brussels. Ageas is Belgium's largest insurer and operates in 14 countries worldwide. The company was renamed from Fortis Holding in April 2010 and consists of those insurance activities remaining after the breakup and sale of the financial services group Fortis during the financial crisis of 2007-2010.

In 2020, the company had 45,000 employees.

History

The company's roots are in the 1824 foundation of the Belgian life insurer Assurances Générales (now AG Insurance). In 1990 AG took over the Netherlands-based firm AMEV/VSB to form Fortis. AMEV/VSB had itself been formed earlier that year by the combination of a savings bank, VSB (Verenigde Spaarbank), and an insurer, AMEV, which followed the end of legislation preventing mergers between banks and insurers. AMEV had originally been founded in Utrecht in 1920 as Algemeene Maatschappij tot Exploitatie van Verzekeringsmaatschappijen.

After its creation, Fortis extended its activities to private and investment banking and to asset management, establishing subsidiaries internationally, and by 2007 it had become the 20th largest business in the world by revenue. That year Fortis agreed to purchase ABN AMRO jointly with Banco Santander and Royal Bank of Scotland Group, but the 2007-10 financial crisis exacerbated problems with financing its part of the acquisition and prompted fears of insolvency. Considered "too big to fail", Fortis received an €11.2 billion bailout from the Benelux governments and saw its retail banking operations in Belgium sold to BNP Paribas, and its insurance and banking subsidiaries in the Netherlands nationalised.

The remaining assets of the company, consisting principally of insurance operations but also including some distressed assets, were rebranded Fortis Holding. In April 2010 its shareholders agreed a formal change of name to Ageas SA/NV, with ownership of the Fortis brand passing to BNP Paribas.

On July 13, 2018, the Amsterdam Court of Appeal (Gerechtshof Amsterdam) approved a €1.3 billion collective settlement of claims asserted on behalf of shareholders of the former Fortis (now Ageas), under the authority of the Dutch Act on Collective Settlement of Mass Claims (Wet Collectieve Afwikkeling van Massaschade) or WCAM.

Operations
The company is the largest provider of insurance in Belgium, owning 75% of AG Insurance (the remainder is held by Fortis Bank N.V./S.A., which was sold to BNP Paribas in 2009). Products are sold through independent agents, brokers and financial planners, and through branches of BNP Paribas Fortis and its subsidiary Banque de La Poste/Bank van De Post.

Ageas also wholly owns the subsidiary Ageas Insurance International (formerly Fortis Insurance International), through which it is the United Kingdom's third-largest provider of private vehicle cover and fourth-largest provider of travel insurance through subsidiaries such as Kwik Fit Insurance. Ageas Insurance International also operates in France and Hong Kong and holds partnerships or joint ventures in Luxembourg, Italy, Portugal, Turkey, China, Malaysia, India and Thailand. In addition, Ageas holds 45% of Royal Park Investments, a special purpose vehicle which manages a portfolio of "toxic" structured credit assets previously held by Fortis Bank.

RIAS is a general insurance company that provides car, home, travel and caravan insurance. is a trading name of Ageas Retail Limited, who are authorised and regulated by the Financial Conduct Authority. It was established in 1992 by David Holden as the Retirement Insurance Advisory Service, originally offering insurance products from a panel of insurers. RIAS was part of Fortis Group, until Fortis adopted an Ageas UK name, reflecting the company’s status as a standalone global insurance group.

In September 2012, Ageas acquired Groupama’s UK insurance operations, boosting its presence in the automobile and home sectors. The deal will see Ageas add another million policyholders in the UK. In 2016, Ageas acquired AXA insurance operations in Portugal, becoming the second largest insurer by premiums, the third Non-Life insurer (with a 14% market share) and the third largest Life insurer (with a 19% market share).

The Ageas UK head office is in Eastleigh, with branches in Bournemouth, Gloucester, London and Manchester.

References

External links

Companies based in Brussels
Companies listed on Euronext Brussels
Insurance companies of Belgium
Belgian brands